Kimario McFadden (born April 13, 1991) is a Canadian football safety/linebacker for the Toronto Argonauts of the Canadian Football League (CFL). He played college football at South Carolina State University. He signed as an undrafted free agent with the Atlanta Falcons in 2014.

Professional career

Atlanta Falcons
After going unselected in the 2014 NFL Draft, McFadden signed with the Atlanta Falcons on May 12, 2014. He was waived on August 29, 2014.

Tampa Bay Buccaneers
McFadden signed to the Tampa Bay Buccaneers' practice squad on September 1, 2014. McFadden was terminated from the practice squad on September 22, 2014.

Atlanta Falcons (second stint)
McFadden signed to the Atlanta Falcons' practice squad on September 30, 2014. He was terminated from the practice squad on October 30, 2014.

Carolina Panthers
McFadden signed to the Carolina Panthers' practice squad on December 2, 2014. He signed a futures contract with the Carolina Panthers on January 13, 2015. On May 21, 2015, he was waived.

Tampa Bay Buccaneers (second stint)
On July 29, 2015, he was signed by the Tampa Bay Buccaneers. On August 30, he was waived. On November 10, the Buccaneers re-signed McFadden. On November 30, McFadden was waived by the Tampa Bay Buccaneers. On December 2, the Tampa Bay Buccaneers signed McFadden to the practice squad. On December 30, was signed to the active roster.

On April 29, 2016, McFadden was waived. On August 28, 2016, McFadden was again waived by the Buccaneers. Two days later, he was resigned. On September 5, he was cut.

Toronto Argonauts
On June 1, 2017, McFadden signed with the Toronto Argonauts of the Canadian Football League.

References

External links
Toronto Argonauts bio
Carolina Panthers bio

1991 births
Living people
People from Jonesboro, Georgia
Sportspeople from the Atlanta metropolitan area
Players of American football from Georgia (U.S. state)
American football safeties
South Carolina State Bulldogs football players
Atlanta Falcons players
Tampa Bay Buccaneers players
Carolina Panthers players
American players of Canadian football
Canadian football linebackers
Toronto Argonauts players